Brian Moore (born 24 December 1938) is an English former professional footballer who played in the Football League for Doncaster Rovers, Mansfield Town and Notts County.

References

1938 births
Living people
English footballers
Association football forwards
English Football League players
Mansfield Town F.C. players
Notts County F.C. players
Doncaster Rovers F.C. players
Nuneaton Borough F.C. players
Wisbech Town F.C. players
Burton Albion F.C. players
Ashfield United F.C. players